The HubCap Comedy Festival is an annual festival of Canadian comedic talent, taking place in Greater Moncton, New Brunswick and surrounding areas. The festival features stand-up comedy and sketches, among other genres of comedy.

See also

List of events in Greater Moncton

References

External links
Hubcap Comedy Festival
Tourism NB website

Comedy festivals in Canada
Festivals in Moncton